A national sport is considered to be an intrinsic part of the culture of a nation. Some sports are de facto (not established by law) national sports, as sumo is in Japan and Gaelic games are in Ireland and field hockey in Pakistan, while others are  de jure (established by law) national sports, as taekwondo is in South Korea.

Official recognition of national sports 
Sports declared as national sport by a law or through any other official means.

Unofficial national sports 
The following is a list of de facto/unofficial national sport(s) by country. As opposed to a de jure national sport, the status of a de facto/unofficial national sport is informal and is provided with no legal recognition of being a national sport. Although some countries have an official national sport defined by law, other sources may also consider another sport to be a de facto/unofficial national sport of the country.

See also 
List of sports
List of martial arts by regional origin

References 

Sport
Sports terminology
Sport and nationality